This page shows the results of the Fencing Competition for men and women at the 2007 Pan American Games, held from July 14 to July 21, 2007 in the Pavilion 3 of the Riocentro Sports Complex in Rio de Janeiro, Brazil. It has a seating capacity of 2,000.

Men's competition

Epée
Held on 2007-07-16

Foil
Held on 2007-07-14

Sabre
Held on 2007-07-18

Team Epée
Held on 2007-07-20

Team Sabre
Held on 2007-07-21

Women's competition

Epée
Held on 2007-07-17

Foil
Held on 2007-07-15

Sabre
Held on 2007-07-19

Team Foil
Held on 2007-07-20

Team Sabre
Held on 2007-07-21

Medal table

References
 Sports 123
 Canadian Olympic Committee

P
2007
Events at the 2007 Pan American Games
International fencing competitions hosted by Brazil